The Callbox Mystery is a 1932 British crime film directed by G.B. Samuelson and starring Warwick Ward, Harold French and Wendy Barrie. It was made at Cricklewood Studios as a quota quickie.

Cast
 Warwick Ward as Leo Mount  
 Harold French as Inspector Layton  
 Wendy Barrie as Iris Banner  
 Gerald Rawlinson as David Radnor  
 Harvey Braban as Inspector Brown  
 Daphne Mowbray as Rose  
 Tom Shenton as Pearce  
 Myno Burney as Paul Grayle

References

Bibliography
 Chibnall, Steve. Quota Quickies: The Birth of the British 'B' Film. British Film Institute, 2007.
 Low, Rachael. Filmmaking in 1930s Britain. George Allen & Unwin, 1985.
 Wood, Linda. British Films, 1927-1939. British Film Institute, 1986.

External links

1932 films
British crime films
1932 crime films
1930s English-language films
Films shot at Cricklewood Studios
Films directed by G. B. Samuelson
Quota quickies
Films set in England
British black-and-white films
1930s British films